Wayne Gretzky's 3D Hockey '98 is an ice hockey game for the Nintendo 64 and PlayStation, released in 1997. The game is endorsed by hockey star Wayne Gretzky, and is the sequel to Wayne Gretzky's 3D Hockey.

The game gained widespread criticism for its lack of changes from the original Wayne Gretzky's 3D Hockey; while the gameplay was tweaked and the A.I. was made tougher, the graphics, music, and sound effects were largely recycled from the original game.

Gameplay
Gameplay consists of two basic options: Arcade and Simulation.  Although the graphics and gameplay vary little between the two, other changes have the effect of changing the chemistry and intensity of gameplay between the two options.  The gamer has the ability to customize period length, fatigue (on/off), line changes, fighting (on/off), penalties (simulation only), rink size (arcade only), puck-streak (on/off), and camera angle.

Simulation Mode
Simulation mode is designed to emulate the real game of hockey.  Players may play five, four, or three to a side, depending on preference.  Recognition of penalties, off-sides, and icing are all optional, but two-line pass is not considered.  Period length can be selected between 5, 10, 15, and 20 minutes.

Arcade Mode
During the Arcade mode checking, hooking, and tripping are more violent.  Fights occur with greater frequency, and penalties are disregarded entirely.  Additionally, arcade mode sees the introduction of a "power shot", which a player may utilize to light the net on fire after a goal.   Arcade mode tends to be more exciting.
By using a code, players can access an additional division in arcade mode that features 4 teams that have since relocated (the rosters are that of the (then) current franchise): Quebec Nordiques (Colorado Avalanche), Hartford Whalers (Carolina Hurricanes), Minnesota North Stars (Dallas Stars) and Winnipeg Jets (Phoenix Coyotes). This division cannot be used however in season mode.

Reception

The game received generally mediocre reviews. While most critics still liked the series' fast, unrealistic gameplay, they also overwhelmingly complained that the '98 installment was largely unchanged from the original Wayne Gretzky's 3D Hockey. Kraig Kujawa, for example, wrote in Electronic Gaming Monthly that "I don't think that the adjustments they made warrant buying this game if you have last year's version." Next Generation stated that "last year's hit is this year's deja vu - don't be sucked in by Midway's hype. If you own the original, there's nothing in the update that justifies a purchase." GamePro was more positive, saying that the recycled elements still hold up, but still advised that players who already owned the original game should rent the '98 edition before deciding whether to buy it. N64.com (later renamed IGN) concluded, "Last year, N64.com gave the original Wayne Gretzky 3D Hockey a rating of 8, and it deserves every single point. Does that mean that this year's version, arguably the same title brought out one year later, deserves the same score? Absolutely not. We don't recommend that you go out and spend the $60 to get a duplicate of a game you already own."

Critics had sharply differing opinions about the new A.I. While some praised the tougher goalie A.I. as the strongest improvement in an otherwise unchanged game, others complained that the new goalies are virtually infallible, and that the A.I. improvement in the other players is negligible.

References

External links

1997 video games
Ice hockey video games
Nintendo 64 games
PlayStation (console) games
Video game sequels
Video games developed in the United Kingdom
3D Hockey '98